Malla Nunn is a Swaziland-born Australian screenwriter and author. Her works include the murder mysteries A Beautiful Place to Die and Let the Dead Lie, as well as the award-winning young adult novel, When the Ground Is Hard.

Private life 
Nunn was born in Swaziland and moved to Perth with her parents in the 1970s. She attended the University of Western Australia graduating with a B.A. with a double major in English and History. She completed a M.A. in Theatre Studies at Villanova University in Philadelphia. While in America she met her husband-to-be and they live with their two children in Sydney.

Career 
Nunn wrote and directed several short film including the documentary Servant of the Ancestors in 1998 which screened at several festivals. It won Best Documentary Silver Images, Pan African, Zanzibar Film Festival, 2000. Her first book A Beautiful Place to Die was published in 2008. Set in South Africa in the beginning of the apartheid era in South Africa it featured Detective Emmanuel Cooper. This was the beginning of the Detective Emmanuel Cooper series.

Bibliography 

 A Beautiful Place to Die (2008) – Book 1 Detective Emmanuel Cooper series
 Let the Dead Lie (2010) – Book 2 Detective Emmanuel Cooper series
 Silent Valley (2012) also known as Blessed are the Dead - Book 3 Detective Emmanuel Cooper series
 Present Darkness (2014) – Book 4 Detective Emmanuel Cooper series
 Contributor to If I Tell You... I'll Have to Kill You (Michael Robotham editor) (2013)
 When the Ground Is Hard (2019) – for young adults
 Sugar Town Queens (2022) – for young adults

Awards 

 2009 Winner Davitt Award – Best Adult Novel – A Beautiful Place to Die
 2011 nominated Ned Kelly Awards for Crime Writing – Best Novel – Let the Dead Lie
 Highly Commended – Ellis Peters Historical Crime Awards – Let the Dead Lie
 2013 shortlisted Davitt Award – Best Adult Crime Novel – Silent Valley
 2013 shortlisted Ned Kelly Awards for Crime Writing – Best Fiction – Silent Valley
 2013 nominated Edgar Allan Poe Awards – Best Paperback Original – Blessed are the Dead (aka Silent Valley) 
 2015 shortlisted Ned Kelly Awards – Best Adult Crime Novel – Present Darkness
 2015 shortlisted Davitt Award – Adult Fiction – Present Darkness
2019 winner LA Times Book Prize – Young Adult – When the Ground Is Hard
2020 winner Bank Street Children's Book Committee Josette Frank Award, Best Book of the Year with "Outstanding Merit" – When the Ground Is Hard
2020 shortlisted Children's Book Council of Australia Children's Book of the Year Award: Older Readers – When the Ground Is Hard
2020 shortlisted Davitt Award – Best Young Adult crime novel
2022 shortlisted Children's Book Council of Australia Children's Book of the Year Award: Older Readers – Sugar Town Queens

References

Year of birth missing (living people)
Living people
Australian screenwriters
Australian women screenwriters
Australian women novelists
21st-century Australian novelists
Australian mystery writers
Swazi emigrants to Australia
21st-century Australian women writers
21st-century Australian screenwriters